Composizioni is the second solo album by pianist Giovanni Allevi. The musician performed Piano Karate at the 59th Festival della canzone italiana.

Track listing
 L'idea - 2:29
 Luna - 3:14
 Le sole notizie che ho - 3:04
 Incontro - 4:10
 Apollo 13 - 3:41
 Monolocale 7.30 a.m. - 3:24
 Affinità elettive - 5:47
 Filo di perle - 3:11
 Il vento - 3:13
 L'avversario - 1:54
 La notte prima - 4:28
 Piano karate - 2:54
 Sipario - 3:47

2003 albums
Giovanni Allevi albums